Glades County is a county located in the Florida Heartland region of the U.S. state of Florida. As of the 2020 census, the population was 12,126, making it the fourth-least populous county in Florida. Its county seat is Moore Haven.

Awards 
 Gov. Jeb Bush acknowledged Muse winning the Florida's Outstanding Rural Community of the Year 2002 award after "providing a safe community shelter to be used during storms."
 Senior Ranger Danny Callahan, of the Florida Forest Service presented Jimmy Cianfrani and the Muse Community with a "10 Year Firewise Service Award" for "its diligence and commitment to the National Firewise Communities USA program. From the smallest project of cleaning the debris off their roofs to the largest undertaking of clearing flammable vegetation 30 feet away from their houses, the Muse Community’s dedication to reducing wildfire risk is commendable."

History
Indigenous people lived in this area for thousands of years.  Due to warfare and exposure to infectious diseases after European contact, native tribes became depopulated.  In the eighteenth century, when the area was under Spanish rule, Native American peoples of Creek and other tribes migrated into present-day Florida from Georgia. Africans and African Americans who escaped from slavery and shipwrecks also migrated to the area, where they created maroon communities.  Some were given freedom by the Spanish in exchange for serving with their militias.  Gradually the Seminole nation formed out of these multi-ethnic people.  Some African-descended people set up communities near the Seminole and became known as Black Seminole.  In the nineteenth century, most of the Seminole and many blacks were removed to Indian Territory after the Seminole Wars, a result of pressure from increasing Anglo-American settlement.

Glades County was created, in 1921, from Desoto County. It was named for the Florida Everglades, though most of the county is prairie and pinelands.

It is one of five counties surrounding Lake Okeechobee and the Lake Okeechobee Scenic Trail.

Glades County sponsors one of Florida's oldest recurring festivals.  Chalo Nitka Festival is a celebration of local history and culture, similar to a county fair.  The festival also draws attention to the long and friendly relationship between the local Seminole groups and Glades County settlers. Brighton Seminole Indian Reservation is located in the county.

Geography

Fisheating Creek is a stream that flows into Lake Okeechobee in Florida. It is the only remaining free-flowing watercourse feeding into the lake and the second-largest natural source for the lake.

Adjacent counties

 Highlands County, Florida - north
 Okeechobee County, Florida - northeast
 Martin County, Florida - east
 Palm Beach County, Florida - southeast
 Hendry County, Florida - south
 Lee County, Florida - southwest
 Charlotte County, Florida - west
 DeSoto County, Florida - northwest

Climate

Demographics

As of the 2020 United States census, there were 12,126 people, 4,859 households, and 3,247 families residing in the county.

As of the census of 2000, there were 10,576 people, 3,852 households, and 2,765 families residing in the county.  The population density was 14 people per square mile (5/km2).  There were 5,790 housing units at an average density of 8 per square mile (3/km2).  The racial makeup of the county was 76.99% White, 10.53% Black or African American, 4.93% Native American, 0.33% Asian, 0.02% Pacific Islander, 5.63% from other races, and 1.58% from two or more races.  15.07% of the population were Hispanic or Latino of any race.

In 2005 the population was 67.0% non-Hispanic white, 17.6% Latino, 10.5% African-American and 4.9% Native American.

There were 3,852 households, out of which 25.80% had children under the age of 18 living with them, 58.30% were married couples living together, 8.60% had a female householder with no husband present, and 28.20% were non-families. 22.70% of all households were made up of individuals, and 11.40% had someone living alone who was 65 years of age or older.  The average household size was 2.51 and the average family size was 2.91.

In the county, the population was spread out, with 22.10% under the age of 18, 7.60% from 18 to 24, 27.00% from 25 to 44, 24.50% from 45 to 64, and 18.80% who were 65 years of age or older.  The median age was 40 years. For every 100 females, there were 121.50 males.  For every 100 females age 18 and over, there were 125.40 males.

The median income for a household in the county was $30,774, and the median income for a family was $34,223. Males had a median income of $29,196 versus $20,987 for females. The per capita income for the county was $15,338.  About 10.70% of families and 15.20% of the population were below the poverty line, including 18.20% of those under age 18 and 11.20% of those age 65 or over.

Education 
 Moore Haven Elementary School
 Moore Haven Middle-High School
 West Glades School, Muse
 Pemayetv Emahakv Charter School, Brighton Seminole Reservation

Politics

Voter registration
According to the Secretary of State's office, Republicans are a majority of registered voters in Glades County.

Energy and environment
Florida Public Service Commission voted unanimously to deny a request by Florida Power and Light to build a huge coal-fired power plant in Glades County, that was to be located several miles to the west of Lake Okeechobee.
The Glades County Commission also allowed the construction in 2007 of a  landfill on the southwest shore of Lake Okeechobee.

Libraries
Glades County is part of the Heartland Library Cooperative which serves Glades County and some of the surrounding counties, including Okeechobee, Highlands, Hardee, and DeSoto. The seven-branch library system has one branch in Moore Haven.

Communities

Indian reservation
 Brighton Seminole Indian Reservation

County Seat
 Moore Haven

Census-designated place
 Buckhead Ridge

Other unincorporated communities
 Lakeport
 Muse
 Palmdale

Memorials 
 The Community Center features a veteran memorial to Jim J. Greer at the base of the flagpole. Memorial reads as follows:   In Memory of, SMSGT Jim J. Greer, USAF RET., Glades County Tax Collector, January 1994 to October 2000, For His Outstanding Service, To Muse and Glades County, The Muse Community Association, April 18, 2002.

See also
 Florida Heartland
 National Register of Historic Places listings in Glades County, Florida

Notes

References

External links
 "The Glades County Republican Party" Primary website for the Glades County Republican Party.
 Glades County Democrat newspaper that serves Glades County, Florida available in full-text with images in Florida Digital Newspaper Library

Government links/Constitutional offices
 Glades County Supervisor of Elections info
 Glades County Sheriff bio
 Glades County Tax Collector info
 Glades County Sheriff's Office Official Website

Special districts
 Glades County School District
 Glades Soil and Water Conservation District
 South Florida Water Management District
 Heartland Library Cooperative

Judicial branch
 Glades County Clerk of Courts
  Public Defender, 20th Judicial Circuit of Florida serving Charlotte, Collier, Glades, Hendry and Lee Counties
  Office of the State Attorney, 20th Judicial Circuit of Florida 
  Circuit and County Court for the 20th Judicial Circuit of Florida

 
Florida counties
1921 establishments in Florida
Populated places established in 1921